L-threonine kinase (PduX) is an enzyme with systematic name ATP:L-threonine O3-phosphotransferase. This enzyme catalyses the following chemical reaction

 ATP + L-threonine  ADP + O-phospho-L-threonine

The enzyme takes part in the synthesis of adenosylcobalamin.

References

External links 
 

EC 2.7.1